Heike Eder (born 30 May 1988), also known as Heike Tuertscher or Heike Türtscher, is an Austrian Paralympic alpine skier. She made her Winter Paralympic debut during the 2018 Winter Paralympics and claimed her only Paralympic medal by clinching a bronze in the women's slalom alpine skiing sitting event.

References

External links 
 
 

1988 births
Living people
Austrian female alpine skiers
Alpine skiers at the 2018 Winter Paralympics
Paralympic alpine skiers of Austria
Paralympic bronze medalists for Austria
Medalists at the 2018 Winter Paralympics
People from Feldkirch, Vorarlberg
Sportspeople from Vorarlberg
Paralympic medalists in alpine skiing
20th-century Austrian women
21st-century Austrian women